Drowning Bear Creek is a stream in the U.S. state of Georgia. It is a tributary to the Conasauga River.

The stream has the name of a local Cherokee Indian. Variant names are "Drownding Bear Creek" and "Bear Creek".

References

Rivers of Georgia (U.S. state)
Rivers of Whitfield County, Georgia